Ruhengeri Airport is an airport in Ruhengeri, Rwanda.

Location
Ruhengeri Airport  is located in Rwanda's Northern Province, in Musanze District, in the town of Ruhengeri. The geographic coordinates of this airport are:1° 30' 0.00"S, 29° 38' 1.00"E  (Latitude:-1.50000; Longitude:29.63361).

Overview
Ruhengeri Airport is a medium-sized airport that serves the town of Ruhengeri and neighbouring communities. It is one of the eight public civilian airports under the administration of the Rwanda Civil Aviation Authority. The airport has a single asphalt runway that measures  in length.

See also
 Ruhengeri
 Musanze District
 Rwanda Civil Aviation Authority

References

External links
Location of Ruhengeri Airport At Google Maps
Website of Rwanda Civil Aviation Authority

Airports in Rwanda